Jessica Dillon (born 17 January 1995) is an Australian soccer player, who currently plays for Lions FC in the Women's National Premier League.

Dillon joined the Queensland Academy of Sport in 2011 after making the 2010 Westfield National Youth Championships All Star Team. After being named in the All Star Team, at the age of 16 Jessica was then selected in the Westfield Young Matildas Under 17s Squad. She competed in the 2011 AFC U16 Women's Championships held in China. The Westfield National U17 Women's team unfortunately missed out on qualifying for the 2012 FIFA U17 Women's World Cup.

Following her selection into the National team she played for Perth Glory in the Australian W-League in the 2013/2014 season.

After Dillon's stint in the Westfield W-League she went to Canada where she played with Toronto Lady Lynx in the Canadian W-League. She would later play for The Gap back in Australia.

References

1995 births
Living people
Australian women's soccer players
Perth Glory FC (A-League Women) players
Women's association football midfielders
Toronto Lady Lynx players